Olyushino is a rural locality (a village) in Tiginskoye Rural Settlement, Vozhegodsky District, Vologda Oblast, Russia. The population was 18 as of 2002.

Geography 
Olyushino is located 40 km northwest of Vozhega (the district's administrative centre) by road. Ogibalovo is the nearest rural locality.

References 

Rural localities in Vozhegodsky District